The Alexander City Millers were an American minor league baseball team in Alexander City, AL between 1947 and 1951.  They played in the Georgia–Alabama League in the Benjamin C. Russell Field.

Year-by-year record

External links
Baseball Reference

Defunct minor league baseball teams
Baseball teams established in 1947
Sports clubs disestablished in 1951
Professional baseball teams in Alabama
Tallapoosa County, Alabama
Defunct Georgia-Alabama League teams
1947 establishments in Alabama
1951 disestablishments in Alabama
Defunct baseball teams in Alabama
Baseball teams disestablished in 1951